Geoff or Geoffrey Jones may refer to:

Geoff Jones (footballer, born 1930) (1930–2018), Australian rules footballer for St Kilda
Geoff Jones (footballer, born 1944), Australian rules footballer for North Melbourne
Geoffrey Jones (1931–2005), British documentary film director and editor
Geoffrey Jones (academic), British-born business historian
John Geoffrey Jones, British judge

See also
Jeffrey Jones (disambiguation)